Internal Revenue Service, Criminal Investigation (IRS-CI) is the United States federal law enforcement agency responsible for investigating potential criminal violations of the U.S. Internal Revenue Code and related financial crimes, such as money laundering, currency violations, tax-related identity theft fraud, and terrorist financing that adversely affect tax administration. While other federal agencies also have investigative jurisdiction for money laundering and some Bank Secrecy Act violations, IRS-CI is the only federal agency that can investigate potential criminal violations of the Internal Revenue Code, in a manner intended to foster confidence in the tax system and deter violations of tax law. Criminal Investigation is a division of the Internal Revenue Service, which in turn is a bureau within the United States Department of the Treasury.

According to information on the IRS web site, the conviction rate for federal tax prosecutions has never fallen below 90 percent. The IRS asserts that their conviction rate is among the highest and that it is a record that is unmatched in federal law enforcement. According to the 2019 Annual Report, 1500 investigations were initiated by IRS-CI, with 942 prosecutions recommended and 848 sentenced.

IRS-CI is a founding member of the Joint Chiefs of Global Tax Enforcement, a global joint operational group formed in mid-2018 to combat transnational tax crime. IRS-CI is also a member agency of the Organized Crime Drug Enforcement Task Force, a federal drug enforcement program concerned with the disruption of major drug trafficking operations and related crimes, such as money laundering, tax and weapon violations, and violent crime.

History

On July 1, 1919, the Commissioner of Internal Revenue, Daniel C. Roper created the Intelligence Unit to investigate widespread allegations of tax fraud. To establish the Intelligence Unit, six United States Post Office Inspectors were transferred to the Bureau of Internal Revenue to become the first special agents of the organization that would one day become Criminal Investigation. Among the first six, Elmer Lincoln Irey was designated as the Chief of the new unit. Hugh McQuillan, Arthur A. Nichols, Frank Frayser, Everett Partridge and Herbert E. Lucas were the other five that made up the new unit.  On October 6, 1919, Irey brought in William H. Woolf from the Office of the Chief Postal Inspector in Washington as his Assistant Chief. They formed the nucleus that became the Intelligence Unit.

The Intelligence Unit quickly became renowned for the financial investigative skill of its special agents.  It attained national prominence in the 1930s for the conviction of public enemy number one, Al Capone, for income tax evasion, and its role in solving the Lindbergh kidnapping. From these promising beginnings the Intelligence Unit expanded over the intervening decades, investigating tax evasion by ordinary citizens, prominent businesspersons, government officials, and notorious criminals. Unofficially, the agents in the Intelligence Unit were known as "T-Men" due to their affiliation with the United States Department of the Treasury.

In July 1978, the Intelligence Unit changed its name to Criminal Investigation (CI). Over the years CI's statutory jurisdiction expanded to include money laundering and currency violations in addition to its traditional role in investigating tax violations. However, Criminal Investigation's core mission remains unchanged. It continues to fulfill the important role of helping to ensure the integrity and fairness of the United States tax system.

In July 2019, IRS-CI celebrated their 100th anniversary. The agency celebrated the occasion with planned events in distinct IRS-CI Field Offices nationwide including Washington D.C., San Francisco, Las Vegas, and Chicago.

Organization

Agency executive

IRS-CI is headed by the Chief, Criminal Investigation appointed by the IRS Commissioner. The Chief reports to the Deputy Commissioner for Services and Enforcement and is responsible for the full range of planning, managing, directing, and executing the worldwide activities of CI. The current Chief is Jim Lee, who oversees a worldwide staff of approximately 3,300 CI employees, including approximately 2,200 special agents who investigate and assist in the prosecution of criminal tax, money laundering, public corruption, cyber, ID theft, narcotics, terrorist-financing and Bank Secrecy Act related crime cases.

Field offices
IRS-CI operates 21 field offices in the United States located in Atlanta, Boston, Charlotte, Chicago, Cincinnati, Dallas, Denver, Detroit, Houston, Las Vegas, Los Angeles, Miami, Newark, New York, Oakland, Philadelphia, Phoenix, Seattle, St. Louis, Tampa and Washington D.C. (IRS-CI headquarters). Many of these offices are further subdivided into smaller resident agencies which have jurisdiction over a specific area. These resident agencies are considered to be part of the primary field offices. IRS-CI headquarters, located in Washington, D.C., controls the flow of the agents and support staff that work out of the field offices across the country. Each field office is overseen by a Special Agent in Charge (SAC) and assisted by one (or more) Assistant Special Agent in Charge. In addition to the field offices in the United States, IRS-CI, through its Office of International Operations (IO), has special agent attachés stationed in 11 foreign countries: Australia, Barbados, Canada, China, Colombia, England, Germany, Mexico, Panama, The Netherlands (Europol) and United Arab Emirates.

Organizational structure

Office of the Chief
Chief
Deputy Chief
Chief of Staff
Communications & Education
Equity, Diversity & Inclusion
Review & Program Evaluation
Field Operations
Midstates Area Field Offices
Northern Area Field Offices
Southern Area Field Offices
Western Area Field Offices
International Operations
Field Operations East
Field Operations West
Narcotics, Counterterrorism, & Transnational Organized Crime
Operations, Policy and Support
National Forensic Laboratory
Financial Crimes
Special Investigative Techniques
Warrants & Forfeiture
Treasury Liaison
FinCEN Liaison
TEOAF Liaison
Strategy
Finance
Human Resources
National CI Training Academy
Applied Analytics
Refund & Cyber Crimes
Systems & Analysis
Operations, Scheme Development, and Support
Cyber Crimes
Technology Operations & Investigative Services
Business Systems Development
Cybersecurity
Electronic Crimes
Program Management, Acquisition, & Contracts
Technical Operations Center
User Support

Rank structure
The following is a listing of the rank structure found within IRS-CI (in ascending order):
 Field Agents
 New Agent Trainee (NAT)
 Special Agent (SA)
 Supervisory Special Agent (SSA)
 Assistant Special Agent-in-Charge (ASAC)
 Special Agent-in-Charge (SAC)
 Management
 Directors
 Field Operations
 International Operations
 Operations, Policy and Support
 Refund and Cyber Crimes
 Strategy
 Technology Operations and Investigative Services
 Deputy Chief of Staff
 Chief of Staff
 Deputy Chief
 Chief

Special agents
IRS-CI Special Agents (GS-1811 Job Series) are commonly called criminal investigators. Special agent training begins with the Special Agent Basic Training Program (SABT) at the Federal Law Enforcement Academy (FLETC) in Glynco, Georgia. New special agents attend approximately six months of training including Pre-Basic Orientation Training Program (PB, Phase 1), Criminal Investigator Training Program (CITP, Phase 2), Special Agent Investigative Techniques (SAIT, Phase 3) and On-the-Job Training (OJT, Phase 4). Special agents must satisfactorily complete the SAIT to retain employment with IRS-CI.

IRS-CI Special Agents are the only employees within the IRS authorized to carry and use firearms. The authority to carry and use firearms is derived from United States Code Title 26, Section 7608, wherein criminal investigators of the IRS are authorized to make arrests under Federal law. Special agents are trained in the use of and currently issued Glock handguns, specifically Glock 19M and 26 self-loading pistols. Remington 870 shotguns and Smith and Wesson M&P15 rifles are also officially issued and deployed.  Special agents assigned to undercover activities may carry and use virtually any common firearm.

IRS-CI Special Agents are trained to execute arrest and search warrants and conduct authorized undercover operations, including technical surveillance.  Consistent with the safe conduct of such operations, special agents are trained in building-entry and non-lethal defensive tactics training, in harmony with current Federal law enforcement use-of-force training.  Special agents also serve as dignitary protection staff and in air marshal roles.

Investigation categories

The Criminal Investigation strategic plan is composed of four interdependent programs: Legal Source Tax Crimes; Illegal Source Financial Crimes; Narcotics Related Financial Crimes; and Counterterrorism Financing. These four programs are mutually supportive, and encourage utilization of all statutes within CI's jurisdiction, the grand jury process, and enforcement techniques to combat tax, money laundering and currency crime violations. Criminal Investigation must investigate and assist in the prosecution of those significant financial investigations that will generate the maximum deterrent effect, enhance voluntary compliance, and promote public confidence in the tax system.

Legal source tax crimes
Investigating Legal Source Tax Crimes is IRS-CI's primary resource commitment. Legal Source Tax investigations involve taxpayers in legal industries and occupations who earned income legally but chose to evade taxes by violating tax laws.

Illegal source financial crimes
The Illegal Source Financial Crimes Program attempts to detect all tax and tax-related violations, as well as money laundering and currency violations. This program recognizes that money gained through illegal sources is part of the "untaxed underground economy" that threatens the voluntary tax compliance system and undermines public confidence in the tax system.

Narcotics-related financial crimes
The Narcotics-Related Financial Crimes Program was established in 1919, and is one of IRS-CI's oldest initiatives. Its goal is to utilize the financial investigative expertise of its special agents to disrupt and dismantle major drug and money laundering organizations. IRS-CI's role in supporting narcotics related investigations was highlighted in the 1996 book,  The Phoenix Solution: Getting Serious About Winning the Drug War, by Vincent T. Bugliosi.

Counterterrorism and espionage
Following the terrorist attacks of September 11, 2001, IRS Criminal Investigation actively participates in federal counterterrorism investigations. In addition to standard investigative support, IRS-CI Special Agents add financial investigative and computer forensic expertise to terrorism investigations. IRS CI's support on investigations related to counterterrorism was highlighted in the 2013 book "Treasury's War: The Unleashing of a New Era of Financial Warfare," by Juan Zarate.

Criminal Investigation also actively participates in high-level espionage investigations, for many of the same reasons special agents originally worked on liquor bootlegger, organized crime, and public corruption investigations.  In many high-level, complex investigations criminal actors are well insulated from culpability apportioned through traditional techniques of evidence development.  The common weakness of many high level criminal activities remains money or the financial benefit, which is difficult to conceal.

Investigative process
New agent trainees receive advanced training in general criminal investigation technique common to all Federal criminal investigators. Special agents use judicially accepted methods of investigation depending on the allegation, which may be tax or non-tax. Special agents receive advanced training in Federal tax law and approved techniques developed within IRS-CI over decades of investigative activity. Part 9, Chapter 5 of the Internal Revenue Manual describes material taught to IRS-CI Agents during their six-month basic training at the U.S. Department of Homeland Security's Federal Law Enforcement Training Centers (FLETC) in Glynco, Georgia. For tax charges, special agents in training focus on three primary "methods of proof" to produce evidence leading to a conviction in Federal court: specific items, net worth, and expenditures. These methods relate primarily to evidence gathering based on how an individual has acquired wealth.  Each method seeks to compare a suspect's standard of living and sources of income to that income reported for tax purposes.

Direct – Specific Item Method
Using the Direct-Specific Item Method, the government seeks to substantiate specific items that were not completely or accurately reported for tax purposes. The government must also show that the items of omission were made willfully to understate the subject's tax liability.

There are three broad categories of schemes suited to the Specific Item Method of proof:
 Understatement of income;
 Overstatement of expenses;
 Fraudulent claims for credits or exemptions.

Indirect – Net Worth Method
In the case of Holland v. United States, the U.S. Supreme Court determined the Net Worth Method to be an acceptable method of proof in establishing unreported taxable income in a criminal tax investigation. The formula for calculating the subject's correct taxable income can be broken down into four steps:
 The special agent must first calculate the change in a subject's net worth (assets less liabilities). This is done by determining the subject's net worth at the beginning and end of a period of time (a taxable year or years) and then subtracting the beginning period's net worth figure from the ending period's net worth figure. This computation will yield a change in net worth (either an increase or decrease in net worth).
 The amount of this change in net worth is then adjusted for personal living expenses, nondeductible losses, and nontaxable items to arrive at a corrected adjusted gross income figure.
 The corrected adjusted gross income figure is then adjusted for itemized deductions or the standard deduction amount, and then for exemptions, to arrive at a corrected taxable income figure.
 Finally, by comparing the corrected taxable income figure with the taxable income reported on the tax return, the special agent can determine whether the subject failed to report any taxable income.

Indirect – Expenditures Method
The Expenditures Method of Proof is a variation of the Net Worth Method of Proof. The Expenditures Method derives in part from United States v. Johnson, United States v. Caserta and Taglianetti v. United States, wherein the respective courts accepted the method to determine unreported income. The Expenditures Method starts with an appraisal of the subject's net worth situation at the beginning of a period. If the expenditures have exceeded the amount reported as income and if the net worth at the end of the period is the same as it was at the beginning (or any difference accounted for), then it may be concluded that income has been underreported. It may be necessary to consider nontaxable receipts during the period in question.

Sources of evidence
Like all other federal criminal investigators, special agents rely on objective, admissible evidence to develop allegations into successful prosecutions brought through the U.S. Department of Justice and the United States Attorney. Allegations of criminal acts actionable within the jurisdiction of IRS-CI are received from a myriad of sources, including informants and undercover investigations. Other valuable sources of information include IRS records, general public records, business records, reports and records from banks and other government entities, telephone records, court records, criminal histories, and intelligence records. Special agents also use arrest and search warrants to gather information.

Recommendations for prosecution
Special agents evaluate allegations of possible criminal acts received from the civil tax sections of the IRS as well as traditional law enforcement sources and direct participation and leadership in Federal task forces and multi-agency investigations. There is no one method by which Special agents receive information or make recommendations of prosecution to the Department of Justice or the U.S. Attorney.

The criminal referral process in connection with U.S. Federal tax-related offenses generally consists of two stages. An initial stage referral may be made by the Examination or Collection personnel of the Internal Revenue Service to the IRS Criminal Investigation function, using Form 2797. After the IRS-CI investigates, evaluates the result of the investigation, and concludes that a recommendation for prosecution should be made, the second stage is a referral made by IRS-CI to the U.S. Department of Justice under Internal Revenue Code section 6103(h)(3)(A) and Treasury Order 150–35. At any time before the second stage referral, the Department of the Treasury has the legal authority to reach a compromise settlement of a criminal case arising under the U.S. internal revenue laws; after the second stage referral is made, however, only the Department of Justice may compromise the case.

Investigation priorities

IRS-CI's highest priority is to enforce U.S. tax laws and support the tax administration. IRS-CI identified 10 investigation priorities for fiscal year 2014:

 Identity Theft Fraud
 Return Preparer and Questionable Refund Fraud
 International Tax Fraud
 Fraud Referral Program
 Political/Public Corruption
 Organized Crime Drug Enforcement Task Force (OCDETF)
 Bank Secrecy Act and Suspicious Activity Report (SAR) Review Teams
 Asset Forfeiture
 Voluntary Disclosure Program
 Counterterrorism and Sovereign Citizens

IRS-CI has also focused on addressing cyber-crime in recent years. For example, special agents played an instrumental role in the 2013 prosecution of Silk Road founder Ross William Ulbricht on charges of money laundering, computer hacking and conspiracy to traffic narcotics. In 2014, IRS-CI created a Cyber Crimes Unit to address the increase in tax crimes that contain cyber components—especially those related to internet fraud, identity theft, and related crimes.

Recent press

Over the years, IRS-CI has continued to maintain a reputation for high levels of expertise in financial investigation and has been involved in a number of high-profile cases in recent years.

Credit Suisse Guilty Plea:
In May 2014, Swiss financial giant Credit Suisse pleaded guilty to conspiring to help U.S. taxpayers file false and misleading income tax returns with the IRS. Eight Credit Suisse executives were also charged with defrauding the United States. The agreement forced Credit Suisse to pay a total of $2.6 billion as a penalty for its tax code violations.
Credit Suisse admitted that for several decades before 2009, it had operated an illegal cross-border banking business that helped U.S. clients conceal offshore assets from the IRS to avoid paying taxes. IRS-CI Special Agents were directly involved in unmasking these tax violations. A Senate investigative report revealed that Credit Suisse had held more than 22,000 accounts for U.S. clients with assets between $10 billion and $12 billion—95% of these accounts were not reported for tax purposes.

2015 FIFA corruption case:
In May 2015, fourteen current and former leaders of soccer's international governing body, FIFA, were indicted on charges of widespread corruption, ultimately leading to the arrest of seven top executives. FIFA leaders were accused of accepting bribes from country representatives in exchange for support in their countries' bids to host the World Cup. The 47-count indictment charged defendants with racketeering, wire fraud, and money laundering conspiracies.
IRS-CI played an integral role in exposing the scandal, as IRS-CI opened the initial criminal investigation into former CONCACAF General Secretary Chuck Blazer in 2011 for not filing personal income tax returns. IRS-CI put together a tax case against Blazer that was ultimately used to convince Blazer to supply information to, and cooperate with, the government to build a case against other FIFA officials. In cooperation with the FBI's own investigations into FIFA corruption, multiple police agencies, and diplomats in 33 countries, IRS-CI helped to crack what has been described as "one of the most complicated international white-collar cases in recent memory."

Dennis Hastert Scandal:
IRS-CI was instrumental in the 2015 indictment of Dennis Hastert, the longest-serving Republican Speaker of the House, on charges of violating banking laws. Hastert served in Congress between 1987 and 2007, and became a high-paid lobbyist after his retirement from Congress. Before his career as a politician, Hastert worked as a High School teacher and wrestling coach at Yorkville High School in Illinois for 16 years.
Hastert violated banking laws by structuring cash withdrawals to avoid reporting requirements. Specifically, he made cash withdrawals of less than $10,000 to hide his efforts to pay $3.5 million to an unnamed person to compensate for and conceal prior "misconduct." At the time of the indictment, Hastert had paid the person $1.7 million.

Kunal Kalra, AKA “shecklemayne”, operation:
In August 2019, Kunal Kalra operated an unlicensed Money Service Business (MSB) in which he exchanged about 25 million dollars for drug dealers, credit card fraudsters, and performed other illicit activities. Kalra owned and operated a Bitcoin Kiosk (aka Bitcoin ATM) that would allow for the exchange of large amounts of money with no Know Your Customer requirements. This is believed to be the first federal criminal case charging an unlicensed money remitting business that used a Bitcoin kiosk.

Welcome to Video takedown:
In October 2019, Welcome to Video, one of the largest Darkweb child pornography sites in the world was shut down.  IRS-CI was instrumental in the investigation by the tracing the bitcoin transactions used by people from all over the world to pay for the illicit material. Jong Woo Son, a South Korean national and the administrator of the website, was arrested and an eventual seizure of the child pornography material was conducted. IRS-CI performed the operation in conjunction with other agencies: U.S. Attorney's Office for the District of Columbia, the Justice Department's Criminal Division, the U.S. Immigration and Customs Enforcement's Homeland Security Investigations (HSI), the National Crime Agency of the United Kingdom and the Korean National Police Agency.

Fallen officers
Since the establishment of IRS-CI, 4 officers have died in the line of duty.

In popular culture

IRS-CI has not been frequently depicted in popular media like other federal law enforcement agencies such as the FBI, DEA and the U.S. Marshals. In fact, when Hollywood could have given credit to IRS-CI for the capture of Al Capone in the film The Untouchables, the credit was given to Eliot Ness and his Untouchables. It is widely argued that Ness is a Hollywood inspired myth and that his character on the film is based on Elmer Lincoln Irey, the first Chief of IRS-CI (then known as the Intelligence Unit), who is historically credited as the real mastermind behind Capone's demise.

The 1947 semidocumentary style film noir T-Men involves two Treasury Department ("T-men") agents who go undercover in Detroit and then Los Angeles in an attempt to break a U.S. currency counterfeiting ring.

The 1971–72 American television crime drama O'Hara, U.S. Treasury involved Treasury Agent Jim O'Hara working under the various law enforcement agencies then part of the Treasury Department.

The 2018–19 American police procedural crime drama television series In the Dark (The CW) features Theodore Bhat as Josh Wallace, an IRS-CI Special Agent investigating Guiding Hope for money laundering.

The 2019 American biographical comedy-drama film The Laundromat shows IRS-CI Special Agents arresting a criminal upon his arrival at the Miami airport.

The 2020 Amazon Prime Video Chilean drama web television series El Presidente shows IRS-CI Chief Richard Weber announcing the charges on the individuals involved on the 2015 FIFA corruption case.

American novelist Diane Kelly wrote a series of humorous mystery novels (12 books, from 2011 through 2017) about a fictitious IRS-CI Special Agent by the name of Tara Holloway.

See also 

 Chief, Criminal Investigation
 Computer forensics
 Cryptocurrency and security
 Federal crime
 Federal law enforcement agencies
 Money Laundering Control Act
 Surveillance
 Tax evasion
 Undercover operation
 White-collar crime

References

External links
Criminal Investigation | Internal Revenue Service
IRS-CI Official Twitter Account

United States Department of the Treasury
Criminal Investigation
Federal law enforcement agencies of the United States
United States intelligence agencies
Government agencies established in 1919
Organizations based in Washington, D.C.
Agency-specific police departments of the United States